Switch is a South Korean television series starring Jang Keun-suk and Han Ye-ri. It aired from March 28 to May 17, 2018, on SBS TV's Wednesdays and Thursdays at 22:00 (KST) time slot for 32 episodes.

Synopsis
The series explores the gray area between legal and illegal.

Cast

Main
 Jang Keun-suk as Sa Do-chan/Baek Joon-soo (dual role)
 Choi Seung-hoon as young Sa Do-chan
 
 Han Ye-ri as Oh Ha-ra
 A prosecutor who is a friend of Prosecutor Baek Joon-soo since their college days. She later discovers about Sa Do-chan and ends up pairing up with him to solve a big drug case.

Supporting

Namsan Club
 Jung Woong-in as Geum Tae-woong
 The head of an art gallery and a famous figure in the art industry.
 Lee Jung-gil as Choi Jung-pil
 A living legend in the political domain and the former prime minister. 
 Kwon Hwa-woon as Jo Sung-doo
 Song Won-seok as Manager Kim

People around Sa Do-chan
 Jo Hee-bong as Director Bong
 Shin Do-hyun as Seo Eun-ji
  as Jung In-tae
 A genius hacker that is part of a group of frauds.
 Son Byong-ho as Old Man Bbong/Sa Man-chun
 Do-chan's father.

Seoul Central District Prosecutors’ Office
  as Jung Do-young
 The head of the Supreme Prosecutor's Office. He has a strong trust in his juniors, but also has a thirst for power.
 Park Won-sang as Yang Ji-soong
 Chief prosecutor. He is an introverted man who is barely adjusting to his career.  
  as Investigator Go
 Bae Min-hee as Jin Kyung-hee 
 Assistant prosecutor. 
 Seo Young-soo as Gil Dae-ro
 Yoo In-ae as Kang Mi-ran

Ha-ra's family
 Kim Seo-ra as Ha-ra's mother
 Lee Joo-yeon as Oh Sa-ra
 Ha-ra's younger sister.

Special appearance
 Son Eun-seo as Choi Min-ah (Ep. 13–14 and 26)

Production
 The early working title of the series was Peacock King.
 The first script reading took place on February 7, 2018, with the attendance of main cast and production crew.

Original soundtrack

Part 1

Part 2

Part 3

Part 4

Part 5

Part 6

Ratings

Awards and nominations

Notes

References

External links
  
 
 

Seoul Broadcasting System television dramas
Korean-language television shows
2018 South Korean television series debuts
2018 South Korean television series endings
South Korean legal television series
Television series by C-JeS Entertainment